Yavgeniy Olhovsky (born 22 December 1983) is an Israeli pole vaulter.

He finished eleventh at the 2002 World Junior Championships and competed at the 2009 World Championships without reaching the final.

His personal best jump is 5.48 metres, achieved in April 2009 in Coral Gables, Florida. He has 5.55 metres on the indoor track, achieved in February 2009 in Blacksburg, Virginia.

References

1983 births
Living people
Israeli male pole vaulters